The 2022 Tour de la Provence was a road cycling stage race that took place between 10 and 13 February 2022 in the French region of Provence. The race was rated as a category 2.Pro event on the 2022 UCI ProSeries calendar, and was the seventh edition of the Tour de la Provence.

Teams 
11 of the 18 UCI WorldTeams, three UCI ProTeams, and three UCI Continental teams made up the 17 teams that participated in the race. Only six teams entered a full squad of seven riders each; eight teams entered six riders each, while the remaining three teams entered five riders each. In total, 105 riders started the race, of which 91 finished.

UCI WorldTeams

 
 
 
 
 
 
 
 
 
 
 

UCI ProTeams

 
 
 

UCI Continental Teams

Route

Stages

Prologue 
10 February 2022 – Berre-l'Étang,  (ITT)

Stage 1 
11 February 2022 – Istres to Les Saintes-Maries-de-la-Mer,

Stage 2 
12 February 2022 – Arles to Manosque,

Stage 3 

Classification leadership table 

 On stage 1, as per race regulations, Tobias Ludvigsson and Samuele Battistella, who were the next two best-placed riders in the general classification not already leading a classification after the prologue, wore the yellow and blue polka-dot jerseys, respectively. However, neither rider was deemed to be officially leading those respective classifications, as no points had been awarded on the prologue for either classification.

Final classification standings

General classification

Points classification

Mountains classification

Young rider classification

Team classification

Notes

References

Sources

External links 
 

2022
Tour de la Provence
Tour de la Provence
Tour de la Provence